WGRQ (95.9 FM) is a classic hits formatted broadcast radio station licensed to Fairview Beach, Virginia, serving Fredericksburg, Spotsylvania Courthouse, and Bowling Green in Virginia.  WGRQ is owned and operated by Telemedia Broadcasting, Inc.

Programming
WGRQ broadcasts a classic hits music format to the Fredericksburg, Virginia, area. , weekday on-air personalities include Dave Adler on morning drive, Paula Kidwell on mid-days, Brad Majors on afternoons, Throwback Nation Radio with Tony Lorino in the evenings and Casey Kasem's American Top 40 on Sunday evenings. Each year, around Thanksgiving, WGRQ flips to all-Christmas music programming and becomes "The Christmas Station." This format flip completed its 15th year in 2020.

In addition to its music programming, WGRQ also broadcasts Washington Commanders games as a member of the Washington Commanders Broadcast Network.

History

Launch
After an application was filed in March 1983, the original construction permit for this station was granted by the FCC on December 7, 1984. This would be a new station broadcasting on 95.9 MHz with 3,000 watts of effective radiated power from an antenna  in height above average terrain. The new station's city of license was to be Colonial Beach, Virginia. The still-under construction station was assigned call sign WPOT on February 25, 1985.

In November 1985, original permit holder Colonial Beach Broadcasting, Inc., applied to the FCC to transfer the permit to Potomac Broadcasting, Inc. The call sign was changed to WGRQ on December 1, 1985, and has remained stable for more than 25 years. The sale to Potomac Broadcasting was finalized in March 1986.

Telemedia era
WGRQ began broadcasting under program test authority on May 3, 1986, with an adult contemporary music format. The station received its broadcast license from the FCC on November 16, 1987.  Just days later, Potomac Broadcasting applied to the FCC to transfer the license to Telemedia Broadcasting, Inc. The FCC approved the transfer on January 4, 1988, and the transaction was consummated on January 20, 1988.

Previously known as "Virginia's Rockin' Oldies 95.9", the station flipped formats from oldies to classic hits on January 17, 2005. WGRQ had broadcast Virginia Tech Hokies football games as a longtime member of the Virginia Tech Sports Network before transitioning to Virginia Cavaliers football broadcasts in September 2009.

Studio controversy / facilities changes
The station was involved in controversy when a rival broadcasting company complained to the FCC in July 2001 that WGRQ's main studios were located too far from the station's city of license, a violation of FCC regulations which required the distance be  or less.

In August 2005, Telemedia Broadcasting applied for a "main studio waiver" which would have allowed them to relocate their broadcast studios even farther from the center of Colonial Beach.  The new site,  farther from the city center, would have allowed the station to eliminate a 100-foot tower built for the studio-transmitter link, a point of contention with the Spotsylvania County Planning Commission.  The FCC denied this application on September 20, 2005.

In January 2010, Telemedia Broadcasting applied to the FCC to change WGRQ's city of license from Colonial Beach to Fairview Beach, Virginia. Fairview Beach is a census-designated place in King George County, Virginia, roughly  WNW of Colonial Beach and significantly closer to the primary market of Fredericksburg. The FCC authorized the change on April 27, 2010. On April 2, 2013, WGRQ received approval to begin transmitting from a tower located off U.S. Route 1 just south of Fredericksburg.

References

External links
 Super Hits 95.9 Online
 

1986 establishments in Virginia
Classic hits radio stations in the United States
Radio stations established in 1986
GRQ
Westmoreland County, Virginia